The family Zygaenidae comprises the "forester and burnet moths", of which ten species occur in Great Britain:

Subfamily Procridinae 

 Adscita statices, forester — south & centre (local) ‡
 Adscita geryon, cistus forester — south & centre (Nationally Scarce B)
 Jordanita globulariae, scarce forester — south (Nationally Scarce A)

Subfamily Zygaeninae 

 Zygaena exulans, Scotch (or mountain) burnet
 Zygaena exulans subochracea — eastern Cairngorms (Red Data Book)
 Zygaena loti, slender Scotch burnet ‡
 Zygaena loti scotica — islands of Mull & Ulva (Red Data Book)
 Zygaena viciae, New Forest burnet ‡
 Zygaena viciae argyllensis — western Argyllshire (Red Data Book)
 Zygaena viciae ytenensis — New Forest (extinct)
 Zygaena filipendulae, six-spot burnet
 Zygaena filipendulae stephensi — throughout

 Zygaena trifolii, five-spot burnet
 Zygaena trifolii decreta — south & west-central (local)
 Zygaena trifolii palustrella — south & east (local)
 Zygaena lonicerae, narrow-bordered five-spot burnet
 Zygaena lonicerae latomarginata — England, Wales
 Zygaena lonicerae jocelynae — island of Skye (Red Data Book)
 Zygaena purpuralis, transparent burnet
 Zygaena purpuralis segontii — Lleyn Peninsula (Red Data Book, presumed extinct)
 Zygaena purpuralis caledonensis — Hebrides (Nationally Scarce A)

Species listed in the 2007 UK Biodiversity Action Plan (BAP) are indicated by a double-dagger symbol (‡).

See also
List of moths of Great Britain (overview)
Family lists: Hepialidae, Cossidae, Zygaenidae, Limacodidae, Sesiidae, Lasiocampidae, Saturniidae, Endromidae, Drepanidae, Thyatiridae, Geometridae, Sphingidae, Notodontidae, Thaumetopoeidae, Lymantriidae, Arctiidae, Ctenuchidae, Nolidae, Noctuidae and Micromoths

References 

 Waring, Paul, Martin Townsend and Richard Lewington (2003) Field Guide to the Moths of Great Britain and Ireland. British Wildlife Publishing, Hook, UK. .

Moths
Britain